The 2003 TG4 All-Ireland Senior Ladies' Football Championship Final featured  and . Mayo defeated Dublin in a low scoring game. Mayo retained the title, winning their fourth final in five years, while Dublin were making  their debut appearance. Dublin led 0–4 to 0–2 at half-time. Two minutes from full-time Mayo trailed Dublin by a point. However the match was decided thanks to a late goal from Player of the Match, Diane O'Hora. Cora Staunton dropped a last-minute long range free-kick into the square. The Dublin goalkeeper, Clíodhna O'Connor, failed to gain control of the ball, allowing O'Hora to score. 
 In July 2003, Aisling McGing, a member of Mayo's 2002 winning team, was killed in a car crash. She was travelling to watch her two sisters, Michelle and Sharon McGing, play for Mayo against  in a Connacht Championship game. Just three months later, Michelle and Sharon McGing played for Mayo in the All-Ireland final.

Match info

Teams

References

!
All-Ireland Senior Ladies' Football Championship Finals
Mayo county ladies' football team matches
Dublin county ladies' football team matches
All-Ireland